Veselka is a Ukrainian restaurant at 144 Second Avenue in the East Village neighborhood of Manhattan in New York City. It was established in 1954 by Wolodymyr Darmochwal (Ukr. Володимир Дармохвал) and his wife, Olha Darmochwal (Ukr. Ольга Дармохвал), post–World War II Ukrainian refugees. Veselka is one of the last of many Slavic restaurants that once proliferated the neighborhood. A cookbook, published in October 2009 by St. Martin’s Press, highlights more than 120 of the restaurant’s Eastern European recipes.

A sister restaurant, Veselka Essex, opened in Essex Crossing in 2019. Another restaurant, on East 1st Street and Bowery, opened in November 2011 and closed in 2013.

History
In 1954, the Darmochwals purchased a candy shop and newsstand at Second Avenue and East 9th Street in New York City in an effort to help the Ukrainian Youth Association purchase the building that housed its headquarters. Wolodymyr Darmochwal gave this venture the moniker ‘’Veselka’’ – the Ukrainian word for rainbow. In 1960, Darmochwal combined the candy store and newsstand with an adjacent luncheonette.

In the following years, as the East Village became known as the Haight-Ashbury of the east coast, Veselka became a social center for a cross-section of the community that included old-world tradition and new-world counterculture.

Veselka was nearly forced to close in the mid-1970s, when the construction of the Second Avenue Subway (later canceled) resulted in street closures along the adjacent section of Second Avenue. By the time the New York City fiscal crisis hit in the 1970s, Veselka was a fixture in the neighborhood. It was able to expand during the economic recovery of the 1980s, at which time the row of phone booths at the rear of the restaurant came to be used as informal office space for East Village performance artists.

In the 1980s, Veselka began receiving reviews and awards that spread its reputation beyond its immediate neighborhood. That reputation was further cemented when the restaurant was used as a location for the films Trust the Man (2006), Nick and Norah’s Infinite Playlist (2008),  Trainwreck (2015),  Ocean's 8 (2018) and  Billions (2018) and memorialized in the songs "Veselka Diner" by Doctor Rokit and “Veselka” by Greta Gertler, which was National Public Radio’s “Song of the Day” on January 24, 2008. Veselka is also featured in City of Fallen Angels, the fourth book in Cassandra Clare's The Mortal Instruments series. Anthony Bourdain filmed an interview with publicist Danny Fields at Veselka that appeared in the final episode of Parts Unknown on CNN in 2018.

Veselka produces 3,000 pierogis by hand every day and uses 500 pounds of beets to make 5,000 gallons of borscht every week. The restaurant has attracted notable patrons including musician Ryan Adams, artist Sally Davies, director Bart Freundlich, performance artist Penny Arcade, comedian Jon Stewart and actors Julianne Moore, Chris Noth, Parker Posey, Justin Long and Debra Messing (who considers Veselka her “late-night mainstay” and her “absolute favorite place").

Veselka remains a family-run business: as of 2020, it is owned by Darmochwal's son-in-law, Tom Birchard, who began working at Veselka in 1967, and run by the founder’s grandson, Jason Birchard. The founders' son, Mykola Darmochwal, maintains a role as consultant.

Veselka continues to support the needs of neighborhood residents and Eastern European immigrants: in 1994, its kitchen staff included four doctors, three from Ukraine and one from Poland, who had recently arrived in the United States. After the 2022 Russian invasion of Ukraine, Veselka's daily patronage more than doubled, from 600–700 to 1,500, as many visitors wanted to express support for Ukrainians. The restaurant was also used to coordinate donations of supplies for Ukrainian refugees.

Reviews and awards
Reviews of Veselka in traditional press highlight its comfort food menu and describe the restaurant as a destination for late-night diners. After a renovation in 1995, The New York Times reassured regulars that the restaurant had not changed its menu.
Representative awards include:
“True Taste of New York Award” from the New York City Hospitality Alliance in 2019
“Age Smart Employer Awards” from Columbia University’s Columbia Aging Center at the Mailman School of Public Health, 2017 
“Best Comfort Food” from AOL CITY GUIDE in 2005.
“Best Late Night Dining Award” from Time Out Magazine in 1996 and 2003.
“Best Salad Under $10” from New York Press, 2001
“Best East Village Diner” from New York Press, 1998 and 2000
“Best Ukrainian Diner” from New York Press, 1999
“Best Borscht In The City” from New York Magazine, 1997
“Best Mushroom Barley Soup” from New York Press, 1990

Other locations

Little Veselka
Little Veselka, located in First Park, was a concession of the New York City Department of Parks and Recreation. It was operated by Veselka and offered a limited menu – primarily sandwiches named for famous Ukrainians and select others, including; Andy Warhol (the Andy Warhola), Leon Trotsky, Rinat Akhmetov, Milla Jovovich and Leonid Stadnik. It closed in 2011.

Veselka Bowery
Veselka Bowery, located on East 1st Street and Bowery, was announced in February 2010 and opened in November 2011. Veselka Bowery offered a more “upscale” version of the Ukrainian comfort food that remains a staple of the menu of the original Veselka. It also offered an expansive drink menu and a selection of dozens of Eastern European vodkas. Veselka Bowery closed in April 2013.

Veselka Essex 
Opened in 2019, Veselka Essex is located in The Market Line, which hosts a group of grocery stores and restaurants in commercial and residential development in the Lower East Side named Essex Crossing.

See also
 East Village, Manhattan
 Kiev Restaurant
 List of Ukrainian restaurants
 Ukrainian Americans in New York City

Notes

References
Danford, Natalie; Tom Birchard (2009). The Veselka Cookbook: Recipes and Stories from the Landmark Restaurant in New York's East Village. New York: Thomas Dunne Books. .

External links
Main Website
New York Magazine: This Mural Can Be Yours
New York Times: A Ukrainian Beacon in the East Village
WOR Radio, New York: Interview with Tom Birchard
Kyiv Post: Veselka serves hundreds daily with Ukrainian cuisine in Manhattan
Thrillist: Every LES Spot Anthony Bourdain Visited in Last Night’s Final 'Parts Unknown'
TimeOut Magazine: 50 Reasons Why NYC is the Greatest City in the World

Restaurants in Manhattan
Drinking establishments in Manhattan
History of immigration to the United States
Restaurants established in 1954
Ukrainian-American culture in New York City
Ukrainian restaurants
East Village, Manhattan